Beaver Run is a tributary of Chillisquaque Creek in Montour County and Northumberland County, in Pennsylvania, in the United States. Reaches of the stream are designated as impaired due to siltation caused by agriculture. Numerous bridges have been constructed across it and it lacks a riparian buffer in some reaches.

Course
Beaver Run begins in a pond in a valley on Montour Ridge in Liberty Township, Montour County. It flows west-southwest for about a mile before turning northwest, leaving behind Montour Ridge and entering a much larger valley. The stream eventually turns north and then northeast for a few tenths of a mile before turning northwest again. Some distance after crossing Pennsylvania Route 45, it begins meandering west-southwest for several tenths of a mile before turning northwest. After several tenths of a mile, the stream turns west-southwest. Several tenths of a mile further downstream, it leaves Montour County and enters East Chillisquaque Township, Northumberland County. It almost immediately reaches its confluence with Chillisquaque Creek.

Geography and geology

The channel of Beaver Run (along with those of Chillisquaque Creek, Mauses Creek, and Kase Run) is partially created by Limestone Ridge and a range of hills running in an east-west direction through the central part of Montour County. To the south, the drainage basin of the stream is marked by Montour Ridge.

Hydrology, watershed, and biology
The mouth of the stream is in the United States Geological Survey quadrangle of Northumberland. However, its source is in the quadrangle of Riverside.

Of these, or 49.4 percent, are designated as impaired. The cause of the impairment is siltation due to agriculture. At least one person has received a permit to discharge stormwater into an unnamed tributary of the stream.

History

Beaver Run was entered into the Geographic Names Information System on August 2, 1979. Its identifier in the Geographic Names Information System is 1169037.

Numerous bridges have been constructed over Beaver Run. A steel stringer/multi-beam or girder bridge carrying State Route 3003 was built over the stream in 1909 and repaired in 1973. A steel truss bridge carrying T-308 was built over the stream in 1912 and repaired in 1997. A steel stringer/multi-beam or girder bridge carrying T-306 was constructed across the stream in 1991.

Biology
There are some areas along Beaver Run where the stream lacks a riparian buffer. According to the Montour County Natural Areas Inventory, planting native trees along the stream in these reaches would reduce nonpoint source pollution and raise water quality.

An unnamed tributary of Beaver Run is designated as a Warmwater Fishery.

See also
Mud Creek (Chillisquaque Creek), next tributary of Chillisquaque Creek going upstream
List of rivers of Pennsylvania

References

Rivers of Montour County, Pennsylvania
Tributaries of Chillisquaque Creek
Rivers of Pennsylvania